Simon Noël (born November 17, 1947) is a judge currently serving on the Federal Court of Canada.

From 1979 to 1981, he acted as counsel on the Royal Commission of Inquiry into Certain Activities of the RCMP, and co-chief prosecutor on the Commission reviewing the Somalia Affair.

Noël retired from the Federal Court on August 31, 2022.

On October 5, 2022 it was announced that the Governor General in Council had appointed Noël as the new Intelligence Commissioner of Canada for a five-year term, effective October 1, 2022.

References

1947 births
Living people
Judges of the Federal Court of Canada